The Auaiá-Miçu River is a river located in the Mato Grosso state of western Brazil.

See also
List of rivers of Mato Grosso

References
Brazilian Ministry of Transport

Rivers of Mato Grosso